Beta Horologii, Latinized from β Horologii, is the third-brightest star in the southern constellation of Horologium. It is faintly visible to the naked eye with an apparent visual magnitude of 4.98. Based upon an annual parallax shift of 11.07 mas as seen from Earth, it is located about 295 light years from the Sun. The star is moving away with a radial velocity of +24 km/s.

This is a solitary, A-type giant with a stellar classification of A3/5 III(m). It is a suspected chemically peculiar star  of the metallic-line type. Beta Horologii has a relatively high rate of spin with a projected rotational velocity of 115 km/s, giving it an oblate shape with an equatorial bulge that is an estimated 10% wider compared to the polar radius. It has about 1.40 times the radius of the Sun and is radiating 63 times the Sun's luminosity from its photosphere at an effective temperature of 8,303 K.

References

External links
Jim Kaler's Stars, University of Illinois: BETA HOR(Beta Horologii)

A-type giants
Horologium (constellation)
Horologii, Beta
PD-64 00215
018866
013884
0909